The Showstopper of the Year ESPY Award was presented annually from 1993 to 1999.

List of winners

See also
Best Moment ESPY Award
Best Play ESPY Award
GMC Professional Grade Play ESPY Award
Under Armour Undeniable Performance ESPY Award

Notes

References

ESPY Awards